Klaus "Auge" Augenthaler (born 26 September 1957) is a German football manager and former player. A defender, he won seven Bundesliga titles in his 15-year club career with Bayern Munich. He also represented the West Germany national team, winning the FIFA World Cup in 1990.

In 2005, Augenthaler was named as a member of the greatest Bayern Munich XI in the club's history.

Playing years
Augenthaler was born in Fürstenzell, Bavaria, West Germany. He played generally in the position of centre-back or, especially in the later part of his career, as a sweeper. In his years with Bayern Munich, Augenthaler won the Bundesliga title seven times and the DFB-Pokal three times. In the European Cup he was runner-up in 1982, vs. Aston Villa (0–1), and again in 1987, although he missed the final due to suspension, when Bayern lost 2–1 to FC Porto.

From 1984 until the end of his career as player in 1991, Augenthaler also captained his club side. He played 404 Bundesliga matches and made 89 appearances in European cup competitions for Bayern.

Between 1983 and 1990, he played 27 times for West Germany, with which he won the World Cup 1990 in Italy in the final against Argentina (1–0). He was part of the squad that reached the final of the 1986 World Cup.

Managerial career
Augenthaler's managerial career started as assistant coach with Bayern Munich, serving under coaches Søren Lerby, Erich Ribbeck, Franz Beckenbauer, Giovanni Trapattoni and Otto Rehhagel. He managed the last match of the 1995–96 season against Fortuna Düsseldorf. From there he moved to become head coach of Austrian side Grazer AK from 1997 to 2000, taking them to two third placings.

In the winter break of 1999–2000, Augenthaler left Graz and took over 1. FC Nürnberg on 2 March 2000, then in the second division, leading them to promotion.

On 29 April 2003, Nürnberg sacked Augenthaler, as the club was facing relegation. He took over the reins at Bayer 04 Leverkusen in May 2003. He managed to save the club from relegation and stayed on there until September 2005.

In December of that same year, he was hired by VfL Wolfsburg. His undistinguished time there ended shortly before the end of the season 2006–07. On 23 March 2010, he signed a half-year contract with SpVgg Unterhaching and replaced Matthias Lust. His contract was terminated on 3 June 2011. 

Augenthaler rejected contract offers from China and Turkey due to a lack of interest. He applied to become the new head coach of 1860 Munich in 2015.

Coaching record

Honours

Player 
Bayern Munich
 Bundesliga: 1979–80, 1980–81, 1984–85, 1985–86, 1986–87, 1988–89 and 1989–90
 DFB-Pokal: 1981–82, 1983–84, 1985–86
 DFB-Supercup: 1987, 1990
 Länderpokal: 1977
 European Cup runner-up: 1982, 1987

Germany
 FIFA World Cup: 1990, runner-up 1986

Individual
 kicker Bundesliga Team of the Season: 1989–85, 1988–89
 Goal of the Year (Germany): 1989
 Goal of the Decade (Germany)
 Bayern Munich All-Time XI

Manager 
1. FC Nürnberg
 2. Bundesliga: 2000–01

See also
List of one-club men

References

External links 

 Klaus Augenthaler at leverkusen.com 
 
 
 

1957 births
Living people
German footballers
Germany international footballers
Germany B international footballers
Germany youth international footballers
German football managers
FC Bayern Munich footballers
FC Bayern Munich II players
1986 FIFA World Cup players
1990 FIFA World Cup players
Footballers from Bavaria
FIFA World Cup-winning players
Bundesliga players
Bayer 04 Leverkusen managers
FC Bayern Munich non-playing staff
1. FC Nürnberg managers
VfL Wolfsburg managers
West German footballers
Bundesliga managers
Grazer AK managers
Association football defenders
3. Liga managers
People from Passau (district)
Sportspeople from Lower Bavaria
German expatriate sportspeople in Austria
Expatriate football managers in Austria
German expatriate football managers